The 1989 All-Ireland Senior Club Camogie Championship for the leading clubs in the women's team field sport of camogie was won for the third year in succession and the record eighth time in all by St Paul’s from Kilkenny, who defeated Mullagh from Galway in the final, played at Nowlan Park. It was the first club championship final to be played under the new rules fixing the duration of matches at 60 minutes.

Arrangements
The championship was organised on the traditional provincial system used in Gaelic Games since the 1880s, with Swatragh and Sixmilebridge winning the championships of the other two provinces.

The Final
Mullagh had won Féile na nGael titles in 1985 and 1986 and were first time Galway champions. Despite scoring 4-2 they were heavily defeated by 14 points in the final.

Final stages

References

External links
 Camogie Association

1989 in camogie
1989